Turkey participated at the 2015 Summer Universiade, in Gwangju, South Korea.

Competitors

Medals by sport

Medalists

Archery

Athletics

Track & road events

Field events

Basketball

Men

Group D

|}

9th–16th place

13th–16th place

15th place

Fencing

Gymnastics

Artistic
Men
Team all-around & Individual Qualification

Qualification Legend: Q = Qualified to apparatus final

Individual all-around

Apparatus

Handball

Men

Group A

9th place

Judo

Men

Women

Team

Shooting

Men

Women

Swimming

Taekwondo

Men

Women

Volleyball

Women
Group D

|}

|}
9th–16th place

|}
13th–16th place

|}
13th–16th place

|}

Water polo

Men

Group B

9th–13th place

References

External links

Nations at the 2015 Summer Universiade
2015 in Turkish sport
2015